Cantarell may refer to
Cantarell (font), the default typeface used in the user interface of GNOME since version 3.0
Cantarell Field (or Cantarell Complex), an aging supergiant oil field in Mexico